Sirajganj Sadar is an upazila of Sirajganj District in the Division of Rajshahi, Bangladesh.

Geography
It is bounded by Kazipur upazila on the north, Kamarkhanda and Belkuchi upazilas on the south, Sarishabari, Kalihati and Bhuapur upazilas on the east, Kamarkhanda, Raiganj and Dhunat upazilas on the west.

Demographics

According to the 2011 Bangladesh census, Sirajganj Sadar Upazila had 125,485 households and a population of 555,155, 30.1% of whom lived in urban areas. 10.4% of the population was under the age of 5. The literacy rate (age 7 and over) was 48.0%, compared to the national average of 51.8%.

Administration
Sirajganj Sadar Thana was formed under Mymensingh district in 1772 and it was turned into an upazila in 1984.

Sirajganj Sadar Upazila is divided into Sirajganj Municipality and ten union parishads: Bagbati, Bohuli,  Kaliahoripur, Khokshabari, Kawakhola, Mesra, Ratankandi, Shialkol, Songachha, and Soydabad. The union parishads are subdivided into 187 mauzas and 294 villages.

Sirajganj Municipality is subdivided into 15 wards and 50 mahallas.

Education

Sirajganj Sadaar upazila boasts numerous educational institutions including:

Shaheed M. Munsur Ali Medical College (2014), North Bengal Medical college (2001), Sirajganj Government College (1940),  Islamia Government College (1921), Rashiddozzoha Government Women's College(1966), Bhashani Degree College(1994), Rajob Ali Memorial Science College(1999), Abdullah al Mahmud Degree college(1987), Sirajganj Govt. MATS, Sheikh Hasina Nursing College, Sirajganj Government Technical College(1966), Sirajganj Polytechnic Institute(2000), B.L Government Boys High School(1869), Bagbati High School(1866), Jnanadainy High School(1882), Victoria High School(1898), Char Songachha Islamia Fazil Madrasah (1919), Bhatpiary J.R.S High School(1933), Saleha Ishaque Government Girls High School(1937), Mesra High School(1948), Gotia High school(1982), Rupsha High School(1989), Suchona Kinder Garten High School-Rupsha(2003), Sabuj Kanan High School (1980), Siajganj Collectorate School & College(2003), Jewels oxford international school(2002), Haji Ali Ahmad High School(1947), Jahanara High School(1969), Gowri-Urban High School(1968), S.B Railway Colony High School & College(1964), PDB High school(1973), Police Line School & College(2011), Shaheed Model School(2012), Goyla Model Govt. Primary School(1845).

Notable people
 Abdullah al Mahmood, lawyer and politician, was born in Sirajganj in 1902.
 Iqbal Hasan Mahmud Tuku, former minister and politician
 Rumana Mahmood, politician
 Abdullah-Al-Muti, science educator and writer, was born at Fulbari in 1930.

See also
 Upazilas of Bangladesh
 Districts of Bangladesh
 Divisions of Bangladesh

References

Sirajganj Sadar Upazila